Nazareno Gabriel Fernández Colombo (born 12 January 1997) is an Argentine professional footballer who plays as a defender.

Career

Club
Platense were Fernández Colombo's first club. He was promoted into their senior squad by manager Juan Carlos Kopriva during the 2016–17 Primera B Metropolitana campaign, with the defender making his professional debut during a goalless draw away to Defensores de Belgrano on 24 September 2016. He subsequently made eight more appearances that season, before being selected four times in 2017–18. On 4 July 2018, Fernández Colombo joined Atlético de Rafaela of Primera B Nacional.

International
In 2017, Fernández Colombo was selected to train with the Argentina U20s.

Career statistics
.

Honours
Platense
Primera B Metropolitana: 2017–18

References

External links

1997 births
Living people
Sportspeople from Buenos Aires Province
Argentine footballers
Association football defenders
Primera B Metropolitana players
Club Atlético Platense footballers
Atlético de Rafaela footballers